Thotlakonda Buddhist Complex is situated on a hill near Bheemunipatnam about  from Visakhapatnam in Andhra Pradesh, India. The Telugu name Toṭlakoṇḍa derived from the presence of a number of rock-cut cisterns hewn into the bedrock of the hillock. In 2019, the stupa was partially damaged due to monsoons, but it was restored by 2021 at the cost of Rs 42 lakh.

Thotlakonda was well within the influence of ancient Kalinga, which was an important source of dissemination of Buddhism to Sri Lanka and various parts of Southeast Asia. Also, it is one of the Ports of entry for all the Visitors coming from high Seas to visit all Buddhist prominent places located closely around 83.3 degrees Meridian East. It provides an insight into the process of transoceanic diffusion of Indic culture, especially Buddhism.

A hill on the sea coast with salubrious climate was an ideal attraction for the Buddhist monks to build a monastery complex here. The placid sea sheltered by the deeply in curved coastline here, provided a safe haven for anchoring ships. People coming from far away places to India are well guided by the longitude 83.3 degrees Meridian East. Thotlakonda, Sarnath, Kushinagar and Lumbini happens to lie almost on the same Longitude. Those coming to India by high Seas wanna travel by the shortest distance and so visited Thotlakonda a transit place, anchored their Ships, took rest for some time on the hill and travelled along 83.3 degrees Meridian East to Buddhist prominent places. 

Thotlakonda came to light during an aerial survey by the Indian Navy for setting up a naval base. After its discovery, major excavations have been conducted by the Andhra Pradesh State Archaeology Department from 1988 to 1993.  The excavations established the existence of a Hinayana Buddhist complex which flourished 2000 years ago. To the south of the complex there is a tank which served as a water source to the inhabitants of the monastery.

The excavations reveal Satavahana dynasty lead and Roman silver coins indicating foreign trade; terracotta tiles, stucco decorative pieces, sculptured panels, miniature stupa models in stone, and Buddha footprints were also found. The excavations also yielded twelve inscriptions in the Dhamna script. From polygraphic studies, it appears that the hill might have been known as Senagiri; Sena in Pali means "elder, superior".

Thotlakonda's peak activity was between the 2nd century BCE and the 2nd century CE owing to brisk Roman trade and religious missions sent abroad. Thotlakonda came into existence along with nearby sites in Visakhapatnam like Bavikonda and Pavurallakonda. The lofty stupas shining during the day, with their light lime plaster and with rows of wick lamps during nights, might have served as guiding landmarks of nautical commuters. There appears to have been no royal patronage for this monastery. However traders and local believers seem to have supported the complex. In its heyday, Thotlakonda might have accommodated more than 100 bhikkhus.

The complex had arrangements for storing food, clothing, medicines and served as a religious cum academic centre. Nikaya Buddhism appears to have been practiced here, including the worship of Gautama Buddha through symbols such as padukas and other material remains rather than using human representation.

Thotlakonda had declined by the end of the 3rd century.

References

External links

 Travel Article on Thotlakonda.
 https://web.archive.org/web/20170626104454/http://asihyd.ap.nic.in/monuments.html

Buddhist sites in Andhra Pradesh
Stupas in India
Archaeological sites in Andhra Pradesh
Tourist attractions in Visakhapatnam
Buildings and structures in Visakhapatnam district